Carambola may refer to:
Carambola, also known as star fruit, the fruit of Averrhoa carambola
 Carambola!, a 1974 western comedy film
Carom billiards, the overarching title of a family of billiards games generally played on cloth-covered pocketless tables